This is a list of members of the Victorian Legislative Assembly from the elections of 26 August – 26 September 1859 to the elections of 2 – 19 August 1861.

The Assembly was created in 1856. The following districts were abolished by the Victorian Electoral Act, 1858, taking effect at the 1859 elections: Alberton, Anglesey, Castlemaine Boroughs, Colac, Dundas and Follett (renamed to Dundas), Evelyn and Mornington, Geelong, Gippsland, Loddon, Melbourne, North Grant,  North Grenville, Polwarth, Ripon, Hampden and South Grenville, South Melbourne and Talbot.

The following districts were created in 1859: Crowlands, Geelong East, Geelong West, Avoca, Dalhousie, North Gippsland, 
Polwarth and South Grenville, Sandridge, South Gippsland, Ararat, Castlemaine, Creswick, 
East Bourke Boroughs, Emerald Hill, Maldon, 
Mandurang, Maryborough, Ripon and Hampden, West Melbourne, Ballaarat East, Ballaarat West, East Melbourne, Grenville, North Melbourne, Gippsland North, Mornington, Dundas (renamed from Dundas and Follett) and Evelyn.

Note the "Term in Office" refers to that members term(s) in the Assembly, not necessarily for that electorate.

 Aspinall resigned September 1860, replaced by Henry Samuel Chapman in a November 1860 by-election
 Brodie  resigned in May 1861, replaced by James Sullivan in a May 1861 by-election
 Cowie resigned in January 1860, replaced by Augustus Greeves in a February 1860 by-election
 Ebden resigned in May 1861, replaced by George Higinbotham in a May 1861 by-election
 Everard left Parliament in December 1859, replaced by Wilson Gray in a January 1860 by-election
 Harker resigned in March 1860, replaced by James Martley in a March 1860 by-election 
 Harrison resigned September 1860, replaced by Nicholas Foott in a November 1860 by-election
 Horne resigned February 1861, replaced by Thomas Manifold in a March 1861 by-election
 Hunter  left Parliament in July 1861, replaced by Graham Berry in a July 1861 by-election
 Ireland lost the December 1860 by-election after being appointed Attorney-General, replaced by Nathaniel Levi sworn in January 1861
 Keefer resigned in March 1860, replaced by John Donald in a March 1860 by-election
 King resigned November 1859, replaced by William Bell in a January 1860 by-election. Bell resigned in March 1860, replaced by William Jones in a March 1860 by-election
 Macadam left Parliament in May 1861, replaced by Alexander John Smith (May to July 1861)
 McLeod resigned in September 1860, replaced by William Haines in a November 1860 by-election
 McMillan resigned November 1860, replaced by George Hedley in a January 1861 by-election
 Phelan's election was declared void in January 1860, replaced by John Carre Riddell in a February 1860 by-election

References

Members of the Parliament of Victoria by term
19th-century Australian politicians